Muhammad Shafqat Malik (born 7 September 1970) is a Pakistani field hockey player. He competed at the 1996 Summer Olympics and the 2000 Summer Olympics.

References

External links
 

1970 births
Living people
Pakistani male field hockey players
Olympic field hockey players of Pakistan
Field hockey players at the 1996 Summer Olympics
Field hockey players at the 2000 Summer Olympics
Place of birth missing (living people)
Asian Games medalists in field hockey
Asian Games bronze medalists for Pakistan
Medalists at the 1994 Asian Games
Field hockey players at the 1994 Asian Games
20th-century Pakistani people